WTWG (1050 AM) is a radio station licensed to Columbus, Mississippi. The station airs a Gospel music format and is owned by CBN Communications, LLC.

References

External links
WTWG's official website

Gospel radio stations in the United States
TWG